Chartreuse Toulouse is the third and final album of noise rock band Tragic Mulatto, released in 1990 through Alternative Tentacles.

Release and reception 

Jason Ankeny of allmusic admired the band for successfully fusing a number of genres, such as psychedelic and noise rock. He awarded Chartreuse Toulouse four and a half out of five stars, while mentioning Flatula's lyrics as being a detractor. Ira Robbins of the Trouser Press noted that while it does lose momentum, the album is a "psychedelic trip" and "one of Tragic Mulatto's great adventures."

Track listing

Personnel 
Adapted from the Chartreuse Toulouse liner notes.

Tragic Mulatto
 Lance Boyle (as Reverend Elvister Shanksley) – bass guitar, vocals, banjo, harmonica, illustration
 Gail Coulson (as Flatula Lee Roth) – vocals, saxophone, tuba, illustration
 Jehu – guitar
 Marc (as Fifi) – drums
 Marianne Riddle (as Bambi Nonymous) – drums, bass guitar, vocals

Additional musicians and production
 Carrie Bleiweiss – photography
 Jonathan Burnside – engineering
 Cecil English – engineering

Release history

External links

References 

1990 albums
Alternative Tentacles albums
Tragic Mulatto (band) albums